The Ất line (Hán tự: 支乙; chi can also be translated to as branch) was the tenth dynasty of Hùng kings of the Hồng Bàng period of Văn Lang (now Viet Nam). Starting approximately 1251 B.C., the line refers to the rule of Hùng Hải Lang and his successors, when the seat of government was centered at Việt Trì.

History
Hùng Hải Lang was born approximately 1287 B.C., and took the regnal name of Hùng Uy Vương upon becoming Hùng king. The series of all Hùng kings following Hùng Hải Lang took that same regnal name of Hùng Uy Vương to rule over Văn Lang until approximately 1162 B.C.

By about 1200 B.C., a new phase of development of wet-rice cultivation and bronze casting occurred in the Ma River and Red River plains. These developments later contributed to the rise of the Đông Sơn culture, notable for its elaborate bronze drums.

References

Bibliography
Nguyễn Khắc Thuần (2008). Thế thứ các triều vua Việt Nam. Giáo Dục Publisher.

Ancient peoples
Hồng Bàng dynasty
12th-century BC disestablishments
13th-century BC establishments